The Cherokee Nation Warriors Society is a society of Cherokee Nation tribal members who are also military veterans, and who were honorably discharged from military service.  The society is based in Tahlequah, Oklahoma, and is administered by the Cherokee Nation Office of Veterans Affairs.  Most of the society members participate in the Gourd Dance.

Membership in this society is open to all veterans of the Cherokee Nation of any branch of military service.  The Cherokee Nation Warriors Society members and those veterans who gave their lives in military service have bricks with their names inscribed paving the Cherokee Nation Warriors Memorial and Pavilion located at the Cherokee Nation Headquarters in Tahlequah, Oklahoma.  The memorial is dedicated to all Cherokee Citizens and their families who served honorably in the United States Military and to those who gave their lives in defense of the United States and the Cherokee homeland.

References
Cherokee Nation Warriors memorial
Cherokee Nation Veterans Ceremony

American veterans' organizations
Organizations based in the Cherokee Nation
Native American organizations
Organizations based in Oklahoma